Richard Pryse may refer to:

 Richard Pryse (of Gogerddan) (died 1623), English politician who sat in the House of Commons from 1584
 Sir Richard Pryse, 1st Baronet (died 1651), Welsh politician who sat in the House of Commons from 1646 to 1648
 Sir Richard Pryse, 2nd Baronet (1630–1675), Welsh landowner and politician who sat in the House of Commons in 1660